Tolu Fahamokioa (born 5 May 1991) is a Tongan rugby union player, who currently plays as a prop for  in New Zealand's National Provincial Championship. During the 2015 Super Rugby season he also made an appearance for the.

Fahamokioa first moved to New Zealand from Tonga in 1999.

References

External links
NZ Rugby History profile
Itsrugby.co.uk profile

1991 births
Living people
Tongan emigrants to New Zealand
Tongan expatriate rugby union players
Tongan expatriate sportspeople in the United States
Expatriate rugby union players in the United States
New Zealand expatriate rugby union players
New Zealand expatriate sportspeople in the United States
Rugby union props
Wellington rugby union players
Hawke's Bay rugby union players
Hurricanes (rugby union) players
New England Free Jacks players
Waikato rugby union players
Tongan rugby union players
Tonga international rugby union players